Nora Fischer may refer to:
Nora Barry Fischer, American judge
Nora Fischer (singer)